Han Chung-sik (born 25 May 1961) is a South Korean gymnast. He competed in eight events at the 1984 Summer Olympics.

References

1961 births
Living people
South Korean male artistic gymnasts
Olympic gymnasts of South Korea
Gymnasts at the 1984 Summer Olympics
Place of birth missing (living people)
Asian Games medalists in gymnastics
Gymnasts at the 1986 Asian Games
Asian Games silver medalists for South Korea
Medalists at the 1986 Asian Games